John William Shaw (December 12, 1863 – November 2, 1934) was an American clergyman of the Roman Catholic Church. He served as Bishop of San Antonio (1911–1918) and Archbishop of New Orleans (1918–1934).

Biography
One of six children, Shaw was born in Mobile, Alabama to Patrick and Elizabeth (née Smith) Shaw. He was a pupil at the parochial school of St Vincent de Paul Church and the academy of the Brothers of the Sacred Heart in his native city. He later was sent, with one of his brothers, to St Finian's Seminary at Navan, County Meath, Ireland. He studied at the Urban College of Propaganda and Pontifical North American College in Rome in 1882–1888.

On May 26, 1888, he was ordained to the priesthood by Cardinal Lucido Parocchi at the Basilica of St John Lateran.

Upon returning to the Diocese of Mobile, Shaw served as a curate at Immaculate Conception Cathedral until 1889, when he was transferred to St Peter's Church in Montgomery. In 1891, he returned to Immaculate Conception Cathedral as its rector. He served as chancellor of the diocese from 1898 to 1910.

On February 7, 1910, Shaw was appointed titular bishop of Castabala and coadjutor bishop of the Diocese of San Antonio in Texas by Pope Pius X. He received his episcopal consecration on the following April 14 from Archbishop James Blenk, S.M., with Bishops Edward Patrick Allen and Cornelius Van de Ven serving as co-consecrators.

Due to the declining health of Bishop John Anthony Forest, he was made apostolic administrator of the diocese on May 18, 1910. Upon Bishop Forest's death on March 11, 1911, Shaw succeeded him as the fourth Bishop of San Antonio. His efforts to provide relief to Mexican refugees in Texas caused the Archbishop of Mexico City to make Shaw an honorary canon of the Basilica of Our Lady of Guadalupe.

In 1915, Shaw opened St John's Seminary in his personal residence. While in San Antonio, he also restored and reopened several historic Spanish missions.

On January 25, 1918, Shaw was appointed the eighth Archbishop of New Orleans, Louisiana by Pope Benedict XV. He was the first American-born head of that archdiocese. He founded Notre Dame Seminary in 1923.

Death
Shaw died from a heart attack in 1934, aged 70.

Legacy
Archbishop Shaw High School in Marrero, Louisiana was dedicated in his honor on August 19, 1962, in part for his work in the development of the Catholic community on the West Bank. He had dedicated Hope Haven Institute, an orphanage and foster home, on the property adjacent to the school in 1930.

References

Episcopal succession

1863 births
1934 deaths
Roman Catholic bishops of San Antonio
Roman Catholic archbishops of New Orleans
20th-century Roman Catholic archbishops in the United States
People from New Orleans
Pontifical North American College alumni